Horkelia bolanderi (also known as border horkelia and Bolander's horkelia) is a rare species of flowering plant in the family Rosaceae. It is endemic to northern California where it is known from only a few occurrences in two or three counties. It grows in the mountain forests of the North Coast Ranges. This is a mat-forming gray-green perennial herb producing hairy erect stems 10 to 30 centimeters tall. The leaves are 3 to 8 centimeters long and are made up of hairy, toothed leaflets each one half to one centimeter long. The inflorescence holds several flowers, each with five white petals and up to 20 pistils in the center.

References

External links
Jepson Manual Treatment
Photo gallery

bolanderi
Endemic flora of California